"Bouncin' Back (Bumpin' Me Against the Wall)" is the lead single released from Mystikal's fifth album, Tarantula.

The song was Mystikal's third consecutive top-40 single produced by The Neptunes. While it wasn't as successful as his previous two singles ("Shake Ya Ass" and "Danger (Been So Long)"), "Boucin' Back" nevertheless proved to be the album's most successful single, peaking at 37 on the Billboard Hot 100, while entering the top-10 on both the Hot R&B/Hip-Hop Singles & Tracks (number 8) and Hot Rap Singles (number 7). At the 45th Grammy Awards, it was nominated for Best Male Rap Solo Performance, but it lost to Nelly's "Hot in Herre", which was also produced by The Neptunes.

Single track listing

A-Side
"Bouncin' Back (Bumpin' Me Against the Wall)" (Extended Version)- 4:15 
"Bouncin' Back (Bumpin' Me Against the Wall)" (Instrumental)- 4:15

B-Side
"Pussy Crook"- 4:32 
"Pussy Crook" (Instrumental)- 4:32

Charts

Peak Positions

Year-End charts

References

2001 singles
Mystikal songs
Song recordings produced by the Neptunes
Songs written by Mystikal
2001 songs
Jive Records singles
Songs written by Pharrell Williams